Swåp are an Anglo-Swedish band that produce a musical fusion of traditional nordic music and celtic music.

Biography
Swåp was formed in 1995 by Karen Tweed (piano accordion), Ian Carr (guitar) (both UK), Ola Bäckström (fiddle, viola d'amore) and Carina Normansson (fiddle, vocals) (both Sweden). Together they have made four albums exploring a fusion of many different genres of folk music, including traditional Swedish music, English music, and the music of Brittany and Ireland. Karen Tweed left the band in 2007.

Discography
SWÅP (1997)
Sic (1999)
Mosquito Hunter (2002)
Du Da (2005)

Swedish folk music groups
British folk music groups
Nordic folk musical groups
Celtic music groups
Musical groups established in 1995